The Minister of Croatian Affairs of Hungary was a member of the Hungarian cabinet in Austria-Hungary.
The position was created following the Croatian–Hungarian Agreement in 1868. The minister was appointed by the emperor-king. The officeholder kept a connection between Croatia-Slavonia-Dalmatia and the Hungarian Kingdom (and also the Austrian part of Austria-Hungary). This position was without portfolio.

History of the position
In accordance with the Article 44 of the Croatian–Hungarian Settlement the position of minister without portfolio emerged, representing the interests of Croatia-Slavonia and Dalmatia in the Hungarian cabinet, who became responsible to the National Assembly in Pest (later Budapest), which also functioned as a joint legislature after 1868 (however the separately administered Dalmatia sent delegates to the Imperial Council, not the Hungarian parliament). In December 1868, Koloman Bedeković was appointed the first Minister of Croatian Affairs. On 31 January 1869, Emperor-King Franz Joseph I ordered the abolition of the Croatian Court Chancellery in Vienna which was officially replaced by the Royal Ministry of Dalmatia, Croatia and Slavonia (after 1873 Ministry of Croatia, Slavonia and Dalmatia) in the Hungarian capital and the autonomous Royal Land Government in Zagreb. By May 1869 the ministry moved to Buda and seated at 16 Dísz Square.

Ministers of Croatian Affairs of Hungary (1868–1919)

Lands of the Crown of Saint Stephen (1868–1918)
Parties

Hungarian People's Republic (1918–1919)
Parties

After World War I
After the First World War the ministry was dissolved because Croatia-Slavonia became part of the State of Slovenes, Croats and Serbs and subsequently the Kingdom of Serbs, Croats and Slovenes. However, the position de jure existed until the proclamation of the Hungarian Soviet Republic in March 1919.

Zsigmond Kunfi, as the last de facto minister of Croatian Affairs, was entrusted with the ministry's liquidation between 6 November 1918 and 19 January 1919.

See also
List of Croatian rulers
List of Croatian bans
List of heads of state of Hungary
List of prime ministers of Hungary
List of Ministers of Agriculture of Hungary
List of Ministers of Civilian Intelligence Services of Hungary
List of Ministers of Defence of Hungary
List of Ministers of Education of Hungary
List of Ministers of Finance of Hungary
List of Ministers of Foreign Affairs of Hungary
List of Ministers of Interior of Hungary
List of Ministers of Justice of Hungary
List of Ministers of Public Works and Transport of Hungary
Politics of Croatia
Politics of Hungary

References

Sources

Croatian Ministers